The 1990 All Japan Sports Prototype Car Endurance Championship was the eighth season of the All Japan Sports Prototype Championship. The 1990 champion was the #24 Nissan Motorsports Nissan R91CP driven by Masahiro Hasemi and Anders Olofsson.

Schedule
All races were held in Japan.

Entry list

Season results
Overall winner in bold. Season results as follows:

Point Ranking

Drivers

Makes

References

External links
 1990 全日本スポーツプロトタイプカー耐久選手権 

JSPC seasons
All Japan Sports Prototype